Hedraianthera is a genus of a sole recognised species of shrubs or small trees endemic to Australia from the family Celastraceae.

The species Hedraianthera porphyropetala grows naturally in eastern Australia in littoral or sub-tropical rainforest north from Ballina, New South Wales to Cooktown in tropical northeastern Queensland. They grow in gullies or rocky slopes on shallow soils, sometimes enhanced by basalt.

The generic name Hedraianthera is from Greek, it refers to the flower anthers without stalks. The specific epithet porphyropetala is also from Greek, it alludes to the attractive deep purple coloured flowers, although the species definition includes plants which have different coloured flowers such as green. They are an unusually southern example of ramiflory.

Previously several publications provided informal scientific descriptions of another species under the provisional scientific name Hedraianthera sp. Mossman (V.K.Moriarty 2557) Qld Herbarium. In a 2012 published Celastraceae genetics study this provisionally named species was reassigned to the genus Brassiantha and formally scientifically described under the new name Brassiantha hedraiantheroides, after its likeness to Hedraianthera. Though still relatively closely related the two species were found to be constitutive of different genera. H. porphyropetala here, again became the only known species in this genus and now Brassiantha constituted not only by the one, but instead by only the two known species, this forementioned B. hedraiantheroides and the New Guinean B. pentamera. B. hedraiantheroides grows naturally only (endemic) in a restricted area of the wet tropics region of northeastern Queensland, Australia.

References

Celastrales genera
Monotypic rosid genera
Flora of New South Wales
Flora of Queensland
Trees of Australia
Celastraceae
Taxa named by Ferdinand von Mueller